Luisa Wensing (born 8 February 1993) is a German footballer who plays as a right back for SC Freiburg.

Wensing has also represented Germany in international competition, playing at junior level in the 2010 FIFA U-17 Women's World Cup and 2012 FIFA U-20 Women's World Cup. She made her debut with the full national team in 2012 against China.

International career
Her first goal for the senior team came on  against Croatia in a 2015 FIFA Women's World Cup qualification match.

International goals
Scores and results list Germany's goal tally first, score column indicates score after each Wensing goal.

Honours
FCR 2001 Duisburg
Bundesliga: runner-up 2009–10
DFB-Pokal: 2009–10

VfL Wolfsburg
Bundesliga: 2012–13, 2013–14, 2016–17
UEFA Women's Champions League: 2012–13, 2013–14
DFB-Pokal: 2012–13, 2014–15, 2015–16, 2016–17

Germany
UEFA Women's Championship: 2013
UEFA U-17 Women's Championship: 2009
UEFA U-19 Women's Championship: 2011
FIFA U-20 Women's World Cup: runner-up 2012
Algarve Cup: 2014

References

1993 births
Living people
German women's footballers
Women's association football defenders
Germany women's international footballers
UEFA Women's Championship-winning players
Frauen-Bundesliga players
FCR 2001 Duisburg players
VfL Wolfsburg (women) players
SV Werder Bremen (women) players
SC Freiburg (women) players
People from Goch
Sportspeople from Düsseldorf (region)